Marián Jarabica (born 27 April 1989 in Čadca) is a Slovak footballer who currently plays for FCU Geresdorf.

Career

Club
In the summer 2010, he joined Polish club Cracovia on a four-year contract. In June 2011, he was loaned to Bulgarian club Ludogorets Razgrad on a year deal.

International
He was a part of Slovakia U19 and Slovakia U21 teams.

References

External links
 
 

1989 births
Living people
People from Čadca
Sportspeople from the Žilina Region
Slovak footballers
Slovak expatriate footballers
Slovakia youth international footballers
Slovakia under-21 international footballers
Association football central defenders
FK Čadca players
FK Dukla Banská Bystrica players
SK Dynamo České Budějovice players
MKS Cracovia (football) players
PFC Ludogorets Razgrad players
FK Pohronie players
FK Frýdek-Místek players
FK Senica players
Slovak Super Liga players
Czech First League players
2. Liga (Slovakia) players
3. Liga (Slovakia) players
Ekstraklasa players
First Professional Football League (Bulgaria) players
Slovak expatriate sportspeople in the Czech Republic
Slovak expatriate sportspeople in Poland
Slovak expatriate sportspeople in Bulgaria
Slovak expatriate sportspeople in Austria
Expatriate footballers in the Czech Republic
Expatriate footballers in Poland
Expatriate footballers in Bulgaria
Expatriate footballers in Austria